Jan-Erik Silfverberg (born January 21, 1953) is a former professional ice hockey player. He played defense for 11 seasons with Brynäs IF of the Swedish Elitserien. He is the father of Jakob and Joakim Silfverberg.

Awards

References 

1953 births
Brynäs IF players
Living people
Swedish ice hockey defencemen